Leeds College of Building in Leeds, West Yorkshire, England, is the only further education college in the UK which specialises in the construction industry.  It was established in 1960 and currently has about 6,500 students. It has two campuses, the North Street campus and the Southbank campuses.

It has courses ranging from entry level through to degree, focussed on National Vocational Qualifications and Apprenticeships for occupations relevant to the construction and built environment sector. In 2018 they were awarded BTEC Apprenticeship Provider of the Year for their continued development of apprenticeships within the sector.

.

Courses offered 

The college offers courses in:
 Architectural Technology
 Brickwork
 Building Services Engineering
 Carpentry & Joinery
 Civil Engineering
 Computer Aided Design
 Construction Management
 Electrical Installation
 Gas Installation 
 Health & Safety 
 Heating and Ventilation
 Painting & Decorating 
 Plastering/Dry Lining 
 Plumbing 
 Roofing  
 Shop Fitting
 Surveying
 Transport Planning
 Wall & Floor Tiling 
 Wood Machining

References

External links
Leeds College of Building web site

Further education colleges in Leeds
Construction industry of the United Kingdom
1960 establishments in England